Melapera is a genus of moths of the family Erebidae. The genus was erected by George Hampson in 1908. Both species are known from Madagascar.

Species
Melapera rhodophora (Mabille, 1879)
Melapera roastis Hampson, 1908

References

Calpinae